Alexander Yuk Ching Ma is a former CIA officer. He was arrested in August 2020, and was charged with conspiring with a family member to communicate classified information up to the top secret level to intelligence officials of the People's Republic of China.

Early life
Ma was born in Hong Kong. He moved to Honolulu in 1968 and attended the University of Hawaiʻi at Mānoa. He is a naturalized US citizen.

CIA career
In 1982, Ma joined the CIA. The following year, he was assigned as a CIA officer overseas, where he held a top secret security clearance. Ma left the CIA in 1989 and lived and worked in Shanghai, China before arriving in Hawaii in 2001.

FBI career
Ma applied to the FBI in April 2003, and began working as a translator in May 2004.

In August 2004, he began working as a Chinese languages contract specialist for the FBI in Honolulu.

Espionage for the PRC
The earliest known date of Ma's alleged spying for the Ministry of State Security (China) (MSS) is March 2001, when he was recorded in a Hong Kong hotel providing substantial amounts of highly classified national defense information to MSS officers.

FBI investigation
In January 2019, Ma confirmed to an undercover FBI agent that he had in the past provided valuable U.S. government materials to the Chinese government, and that he would be willing to do so in the future.

On March 13, 2019, Ma accepted $2,000 from the same undercover FBI agent, who told Ma that the money was acknowledgment for his work on behalf of the PRC.

On August 12, 2020, Ma accepted another $2,000 from the undercover FBI agent.

Arrest
On August 14, 2020, Ma was arrested on charges of conspiracy.

Co-conspirator
An elderly family member of Ma's, who used to be a CIA officer during the 1970's, was alleged to be a co-conspirator in Ma's espionage activities. However, due to the family member's advanced cognitive issues, no arrest warrant was sought.

References

Chinese spies
Central Intelligence Agency
Central Intelligence Agency controversies
People of the Central Intelligence Agency
University of Hawaiʻi at Mānoa alumni
1952 births
Living people